California Pines Airport  is a small airport in Alturas, California. The airport is served by a single asphalt runway.

References

Airports in Modoc County, California